Anton Fransch (c. 1969 – 17 November 1989), nom de guerre Mahomad, was a commander in Umkhonto we Sizwe. He was killed on 17 November 1989 in Cape Town by police and South African Defence Forces for his anti-apartheid activities, after a seven-hour siege in which he used hand-grenades and a machine gun.

Cultural references
Fransch is the subject of The Funeral of Anton Fransch, a poem by Tatamkhulu Afrika, and the 2003 film Deafening Echoes, directed by Eugene Paramoer.

References

1960s births
1989 deaths
UMkhonto we Sizwe personnel
People shot dead by law enforcement officers in South Africa
Anti-apartheid activists
South African democracy activists
South African activists
Assassinated activists
People from Cape Town
Cape Coloureds
Year of birth uncertain
Guerrillas killed in action